Wees may refer to:

People
 Frances Shelley Wees (1902–1982), American-Canadian educator and writer
 Gerrit van Wees (1913–1995), Dutch cyclist
 Wil van Wees (born 1942), Dutch speed skater
 Zoe Wees, German singer-songwriter

Places
 Wees, Schleswig-Holstein, Germany
 Wees Historic District, United States

Other
 WEES-LP, radio station